Simon Robert Naali (March 9, 1966 – August 13, 1994) was a Tanzanian marathon runner.

He finished eleventh at the 1993 World Championships in 2:19:30 hours. In addition he won the bronze medal at the 1990 Commonwealth Games. He competed at the 1992 Summer Olympics, where he didn't finish the race. He died in 1994, aged 28 in Moshi, Kilimanjaro, while recovering from injuries suffered in a hit-and-run accident in Tanzania.

Achievements

References

External links

sports-reference

1966 births
1994 deaths
Tanzanian male marathon runners
Athletes (track and field) at the 1992 Summer Olympics
Olympic athletes of Tanzania
Athletes (track and field) at the 1990 Commonwealth Games
Commonwealth Games bronze medallists for Tanzania
Commonwealth Games medallists in athletics
Road incident deaths in Tanzania
Tanzanian male long-distance runners
Medallists at the 1990 Commonwealth Games